The German Sailing Federation is the national governing body for the sport of sailing in Germany, recognised by the International Sailing Federation.

History

In 1888 the German Sailing Association was founded as the first chairman Adolpf Burmester. At the offices of the Norddeutscher Regatta Verein (North German Regatta Association) in Hamburg met as official founding clubs: Norddeutscher Regatta Verein, Kaiserlicher Yacht Club (Imperial Yacht Club), Verein Seglerhaus am Wannsee (Wannsee Sailors House Association), Segelclub Rhe (Sailing Club Rhe - Königsberg), Berlin Sailing Club, Berlin Regatta Club, Academic Sailors Club (Berlin), Spandauer Yacht-Club, Berlin Yacht Club, Hamburg Elbsegel Regatta Association, and St Georger Segel Verein (St George Sailing Association - Sankt Georgen an der Gusen). In the year 1933 the DSV was subject to Gleichschaltung. At the same time the Freier Segler Verband (Free Sailors' Association), founded in 1901 by workers was renamed and later wrapped up. 1934 saw the liquidation of the Deutscher Seglerbund (German Sailors' Federation) DSB, by which the DSV became the only sailing association in Germany.

Membership

People

Presidents
 1888 - Founding President Adolph Burmester
 1912 - Carl Busley
 1928-1932 - William Rakenius - sailing club house on the Wannsee
 1932 - Dr. E. Koebke
 1933 - Kewisch leader of the DSV for the DC circuit, followed by Unfug, then Kewisch again
 1949 - First President GEWES after World War II. 1951 recovery in the ISAF
 1956 - Fischer
 1973-1985 - Kurt Pochhammer
 1985-1993 - Hans-Otto Schumann - Hamburger Segel-Club
 1993-2001 - Hans-Joachim (Hajo) - Fritze North German Regatta Association
 2001-2005 - Dierk Thomsen - Kieler Yacht-Club
 2005 to present - Rolf Bähr - sailing club house on the Wannsee

Yacht Clubs
See :Category:Yacht clubs in Germany

Notable sailors
See :Category:German sailors

Olympic sailing
See :Category:Olympic sailors of Germany

Offshore sailing
See :Category:German sailors (sport)

References

External links
 German Sailing Federation
 German Olympic Sailing Team
 ISAF MNA Microsite

Germany
Sailing
Yachting associations
Sailing governing bodies
1888 establishments in Germany